New York Water Taxi (NYWT) is a water taxi service based in New York City. It offers sightseeing, charter and commuter services mainly to points along the East River and Hudson River. It is one of several private operators of ferries, sightseeing boats, and water taxis in the Port of New York and New Jersey. It is estimated that 100,000 people ride New York ferries everyday.

NYWT was an affiliate company of The Durst Organization Inc. A partnership venture between Douglas Durst and Tom Fox. NYWT has been in existence since September 2002, beginning with a fleet of six yellow vessels with black and white checks. Today, the fleet consists of 10 vessels.

In January 2017, New York Cruise Lines purchased New York Water Taxi.

History 
New York Water Taxi began operation in September 2002. It was started with a fleet of six yellow vessels with black and white checks. The company was born out of a vision of reclaiming New York Harbor for transportation and recreation.

Vessels

New York Water Taxi operates a fleet of 10 vessels of two classes. The  Ed Rogowsky, Gene Flatow, Marian S Heiskell, Sam Holmes, and Seymour B. Durst vessels were designed by Incat Crowther of Sydney, Australia and built from 2005 to 2008 by Gladding-Hearn Shipbuilding, and are capable of carrying up to 149 passengers at a speed of 28 knots. The  Curt Berger, John Keith, Michael Mann, Mickey Murphy, and Schuyler Meyer Jr. were designed by Nigel Gee of Southampton, England and were built from 2002 to 2003 by Robert E. Derecktor Connecticut Shipyards, LLC, and are capable of carrying up to 74 passengers at 24 knots.

Services
The New York Water Taxi offers a variety of services, including a day pass that travels around Lower Manhattan and Dumbo, which includes admission to the National September 11 Memorial & Museum. The company also operated a shuttle service from Pier 11/Wall Street to the IKEA superstore and Fairway Market, both located in Red Hook, Brooklyn; this service was branded as the "Ikea Express Shuttle." The Ikea Shuttle is now operated on weekends only by NY Waterway. Another service, the Statue by Night cruise, travels along the East River and around New York Harbor. 
Seasonal cruises include Fall Foliage, Audubon Winter and Summer EcoCruises, and New Year’s Eve Family Cruises.

Gallery

References

External links

 

Transport companies established in 2002
Ferries of New York City
Ferry companies of New York City
Tourism in New York City
Travel and holiday companies of the United States
Water transportation in New York City
Port of New York and New Jersey
2002 establishments in New York City
Water taxis